Playroom or The Playroom may refer to:

Film and television
Playroom (TV series), an American children's television series
Playroom (film), a 1989 film directed by Manny Coto
 The Playroom (film), a 2012 film directed by Julia Dyer

Video games
 The Playroom (1989 video game), a 1989 educational video game by Brøderbund Software
 The Playroom (2013 video game), a 2013 augmented reality video game by Sony

See also
 Recreation room